La Espiral Cave (Spanish: Cueva La Espiral) is a cave and archaeological site located in the Bauta Abajo barrio in the municipality of Orocovis, Puerto Rico.

The archaeological site consists of two outcrops containing approximately 170 rock art images dating from A.D. 600–1500. The site was listed in the National Register of Historic Places on September 20, 2011.

References 

Archaeological sites on the National Register of Historic Places in Puerto Rico
Caves of Puerto Rico
Orocovis, Puerto Rico
Rock art in North America
Native American history of Puerto Rico
Pre-Columbian archaeological sites